V*Enna was a Christian pop music and dance duo made up of members Lucy Britten and Sharnessa Shelton. The group was formed by Mark Pennells and Zarc Porter previously from the World Wide Message Tribe as a response to pop stars such as Britney Spears and Jessica Simpson. V*Enna scored three singles on Christian radio: "Where I Wanna Be" (No. 6, 2000), "Do You Wanna Know?" (No. 15, 2001) and "All the Way to Heaven". Britten left before the final concerts in September 2001; they were performed by Bessie Jean Sopeland and Shelton.

Discography

Singles 

 2000 "All the Way to Heaven" (Essential)
 2000 "Where I Wanna Be" (Essential)
 2001 "Do You Wanna Know?" (Essential)

Contributions 

 2000 "O Come All Ye Faithful" on Essential Energy Christmas
 2000 "Do You Wanna Know? (live)" on Celebrate Freedom Live
 2000 "All the Way to Heaven" on Left Behind: The Movie OST
 2001 "Where I Wanna Be" on WOW Hits 2001
 2006 "Where I Wanna Be" and "Why Did I Let You Go" & "Sometimes" on The Best of Movation

References

External links 

 

British pop girl groups
American Christian musical groups
British Christian musical groups
Christian pop groups
Musical groups established in 2000
British musical duos
Musical groups disestablished in 2001